The Landlord and Tenant Law Amendment Act, Ireland, 1860 (23 & 24 Vict c 154) or the Landlord and Tenant Law Amendment (Ireland) Act 1860, better known as Deasy's Act, was an Act of Parliament preceding the agrarian unrest in Ireland in the 1880s, the "Land War".

The Act was named after its promoter Rickard Deasy, the Attorney-General for Ireland in the Liberal Party government of Lord Palmerston.

Deasy's Act amended the Landlord and Tenant (Ireland) Act 1826. The 1860 Act was itself amended by the Irish Land Acts.

The Act made contract law the basis for tenancies and abolished any feudal rents paid by services to a landlord, or by payments in kind.

Section 4
Section 4 remains the most important part of Deasy's act still in force. It provides that all leases of over twelve months must be evidenced in writing in order to be enforced.

Continuing effect
The Law Reform Commission in 2003 stated the act "continues as the foundation of the law of landlord and tenant in Ireland". In 2011 the Minister for Justice published a draft scheme of a bill to modernise landlord and tenant law, however the bill was never introduced to the Oireachtas.

References

External links
 
 Landlord and Tenant Law Amendment Act, Ireland 1860 Irish Statute Book; text of Act as in force c.1910

United Kingdom Acts of Parliament 1860
1860 in British law
Acts of Parliament
Landlord–tenant law
Acts of the Parliament of the United Kingdom concerning Ireland